Esporte Clube Osasco, commonly known as ECO, or also as Osasco, is a currently inactive Brazilian football club based in Osasco, São Paulo state.

History
The club was founded on February 21, 1984. They won the Campeonato Paulista Série B2 in 2000, and the Campeonato Paulista Segunda Divisão in 2001.

Achievements

 Campeonato Paulista Segunda Divisão:
 Winners (1): 2001
 Campeonato Paulista Série B2:
 Winners (1): 2000

Stadium
Esporte Clube Osasco play their home games at Estádio José Liberatti. The stadium has a maximum capacity of 5,600 people.

References

Association football clubs established in 1984
Football clubs in São Paulo (state)
1984 establishments in Brazil
Osasco